DWHB (103.9 FM), broadcasting as  103.9 iFM, is a radio station owned and operated by the Radio Mindanao Network. The station's studio is located at Room 203, Laperal Bldg., Upper Session Rd., Baguio, and its transmitter is located at Diplomat Rd., Dominican Hill, Baguio.

History
Established on February 4, 1980, DWHB was one of the pioneer FM station in Baguio, along with DZWR and DZYB; hence the station began operations as Smooth Jazz HB103, one of the few RMN FM stations at that time, airing a smooth jazz format together with DYXL in Cebu (which they carrying easy listening format). It was the first FM station in the city to carry such format. On August 16, 1992, HB103 was only lasted for almost a decade, when all RMN provincial stations started carrying the Smile Radio branding and switched to a mass-based format. On November 23, 1999, it was rebranded as 1039 HBFM (pronounced as "one-o-three-nine") and switched into a CHR/Top 40 format, with the slogan "Live It Up!". On May 16, 2002, DWHB was amongst the stations relaunched under RMN's iFM network and returned to its original mass-based format. In 2018, iFM started carrying the slogan "Ang Idol Kong FM", coinciding with the nationwide launch of its new jingle.

References

External links
iFM Baguio FB Page
iFM Baguio Website

Radio stations established in 1980
Radio stations in Baguio